Darkling, in comics, may refer to: 
 The Darkling, a Futurius Comics character
 Darkling, a Marvel Comics character better known as Asylum
 Darkling (Archie Comics), a member of the Mighty Crusaders
 Darkling Lords, a group that appeared in Visionaries by Star Comics

See also
Darkling

References